Bailando En Una Pata is the third album by the Argentine hard rock band La Renga. It contains songs from Esquivando Charcos performed live and recorded at the Arena Obras Sanitarias. It was edited in "El Pie" Studios in July, 1995. The album has a live cover of Steppenwolf's "Born to Be Wild" but the title appears in Spanish and a new song at the time: El Viento Que Todo Empuja. The studio version of this song appears in 1996's album Despedazado por Mil Partes. The album achieved 2× platinum status in Argentina for selling over 120,000 copies.

Track listing
All songs by Gustavo Nápoli, except "Nacido Para Ser Salvaje" (Mars Bonfire), "Quiero Un Sombrero" (Felix Cardenas) and "La Mamadera" (Osmar Safety):

 "Buseca y Vino Tinto"
 "Moscas Verdes, Para El Charlatán"
 "Embrollos, Fatos y Paquetes"
 "El Viento Que Todo Empuja"
 "El Juicio del Ganso"
 "Nacido Para Ser Salvaje"
 "Intervalo" (crowd)
 "Negra Mi Alma, Negro Mi Corazón"
 "Luciendo Mi Saquito Blusero"
 "Blues de Bolivia" / Medley: "Quiero Un Sombrero" / "La Mamadera"
 "Somos Los Mismos de Siempre"
 "Voy a Bailar a La Nave del Olvido"
 "Bailando En Una Pata"
 "Cantito Popular" (crowd)

Personnel
Chizzo - lead vocals, lead guitar
Tete - bass guitar
Tanque - drums
Manu - saxophone
Chiflo - saxophone

Guest musicians
Martín Lorenzo - percussion
Gastón Bernardou - percussion
Eduardo Trípodi - percussion

Additional personnel
Mario Breuer - mastering
Jorge Recagno - Video Edit
Martin Valusso - recording assistant
Adrián Muscari - A&R
Pablo Freytes - artwork
Daniel Del Federico - illustrations

References

La Renga albums
Spanish-language songs
1995 live albums
Live albums recorded in Buenos Aires